Alina Tarachowicz (born 21 August 1981) is a Polish chess player who holds the title of Woman FIDE Master (WFM) (1992).

Biography
In the 1990s Alina Tarachowicz was one of the most promising new chess players in Poland. She many times participated in the Polish Youth Chess Championships in different girls' age groups, where she won five medals: two gold (1993 - U12, 1997 - U16) and three silver (1991 - U10, 1992 - U12, 1995 - U14).

Alina Tarachowicz repeatedly represented Poland at the European Youth Chess Championships and World Youth Chess Championships in different age groups, where she won two medals: gold (in 1992, at the European Youth Chess Championship in the U12 girls age group) and bronze (in 1995, at the European Youth Chess Championship in the U14 girls age group).

Since 2000 she has not participated in chess tournaments.

References

External links
 
 
 

1981 births
Living people
Polish female chess players
Chess Woman FIDE Masters
Sportspeople from Słupsk